Rivers and Tides is a 2001 documentary film directed by Thomas Riedelsheimer about the British artist Andy Goldsworthy, who creates intricate and ephemeral sculptures from natural materials such as rocks, leaves, flowers, and icicles.   The music was composed and performed by Fred Frith and was released on a soundtrack, Rivers and Tides (2003).

The film received a number of awards, including the ‘Best Documentary’ awards of the San Diego Film Critics Society and the San Francisco Film Critics Circle. It is an Anglo-German co-production by Mediopolis Film and the British independent film company Skyline Productions.

In 2018, Goldsworthy, Riedelsheimer, and composer Frith released a follow-up documentary, Leaning Into the Wind.

References

External links
 
 
 
 Skyline Productions, UK

2001 films
British documentary films
Finnish documentary films
German documentary films
Documentary films about visual artists
Documentary films about nature
2001 documentary films
Films about sculptors
2000s English-language films
2000s British films
2000s German films
English-language Finnish films
English-language German films